{{Speciesbox
| taxon = Microbacterium hatanonis| authority = Bakir et al. 2008
| type_strain = DSM 19179FCC-01JCM 14558
}}Microbacterium hatanonis is a bacterium of the family Microbacteriaceae. The type strain was discovered living in hair spray.M. hatanonis was selected as one of "The Top 10 New Species" described in 2008 by The International Institute for Species Exploration at Arizona State University and an international committee of taxonomists.

Etymology
Named in honor of Dr. Kazunori Hatano, "for his contribution to the understanding of the genus Microbacterium''."

References

External links
 Arizona State University - International Institute for Species Exploration
Type strain of Microbacterium hatanonis at BacDive -  the Bacterial Diversity Metadatabase

hatanonis